The Swedish Women's Voluntary Defence Organization ( (juridical), communicatively known as Svenska Lottakåren, SLK ) is an independent auxiliary defence organization in Sweden. The organisation is part of the Swedish Total Defence (Totalförsvaret), the national defence strategy of Sweden.

The organisation was created in 1924 as a Swedish version of the Finnish equivalent organisation Lotta Svärd (created in 1918), which subsequently inspired other Scandinavian and the Baltic states to create their own organisations based on the same principles. These are collectively called "Lotta movements" as the majority of these organisations have adopted the name Lotta as the general designation for organisation members.

Organisation 

The organization currently consists of approximately 5,000 women of all ages throughout Sweden. Svenska Lottakåren's purpose is to recruit and educate women for tasks in the Swedish total defence, and to conduct comprehensive defence training. Svenska Lottakåren works in both the Armed Forces and in Civilian Emergency Preparedness. The organization is politically neutral, and is one of the country's largest female networks.

Members are called lotta (singular) or lottor (plural).

History

Origin 
Svenska Lottakåren was created in 1924 with the Finnish women's auxiliary organization, Lotta Svärd (founded in 1920), as a direct role model. The name Lotta comes from a poem by Johan Ludvig Runeberg, about a fictional woman named Lotta Svärd, who took care of wounded soldiers during the Finnish War.

The organisation was founded by a Swedish woman named Tyra Wadner, whom also became the organization's first chairperson, and was originally an auxiliary aid unit for the Swedish Landstorm militia, then named Sveriges Landstormskvinnor (Sweden's Landstorm Women).

The organisation's original mission was none militant and primarily aimed at collecting money for the Landstorm militia. However, by the late 1930s it became apparent that the organisation was needed for militant missions during wartime, however not of combatant nature. In 1936 rules were laid down that regulated the organisation's activities in peacetime and wartime. In peacetime, the activities would be concentrated in four areas: 
Collection of funds for the Landstorm militia
Provide service at Landstorm militia exercises
Training of their own members
Information work to "raise the motherland and homeland patriotism feeling and strengthen the nation's defence".

During the war, Svenska Lottakåren instead had to undertake various forms of assistance for defence in the homeland, especially during mobilization. Members were divided into army, navy and airfields.

World War II 

During World War II, the organization received many new duties. Due to limited manpower it was decided to let organisation members perform service duties of non-combat nature in Sweden's army, navy and air force branches. It was during this period that members of the organisation started being called lottor, as their original name "Landstormskvinnor" did not fit their new roles. This soon became official as the Swedish Landstorm militia was scrapped and replaced with the Swedish home guard in 1942, turning the organisation independent. The new organisation name became Riksförbundet Sveriges lottakårer ("The national federation of Sweden's Lotta corps").

The war also rapidly increased the number of organisation members and by the end of the war the organization had more than 110,000 members, which meant that about five percent of Sweden's women over 15 years were part of the organisation.

Post 1989 
In 1989 the Swedish military started allowing women into all positions within the Swedish armed forces. This meant that the Swedish Women's Voluntary Defence Organization was no longer the only true option for women to get an active role in the defence of Sweden. An equivalent change in Denmark the same year had led to the dissolution of their "Lotta movement" Lottekorps. However in Sweden the organisation would remain as they still held important roles in the Swedish defence, as well as their cultural value.

In 2008 the organisation updated their graphical profile and changed their communicative name into Svenska Lottakåren ("The Swedish Lotta Corps"). The old name "Riksförbundet Sveriges lottakårer" was however kept as the official juridical name.

Awards and decorations
Members and non-members of the Swedish Women's Voluntary Defence Organization which have benefited the organization can be awarded different awards and decorations, for example the Swedish Women's Voluntary Defence Organization Royal Medal of Merit in gold and silver (awarded since 1943) and the Swedish Women's Voluntary Defence Organization Medal of Merit in gold (awarded since 1967) and silver (awarded since 1944).

Heads 
1924–1931: Tyra Wadner
1931–1945: Maja Schmidt
1945–1959: Märta Stenbeck
1959–1966: Ingrid Norlander
1966–1974: Louise Ulfhielm
1974–1978: Alice Trolle-Wachtmeister
1978–1986: Christine Malmström Barke
1986–1994: Marianne af Malmborg
1994–2002: Nini Engstrand
2002–2008: Elisabeth Falkemo
2008–2014: Annette Rihagen
2014–2018: Barbro Isaksson
2018–2022: Heléne Rådemar
2022-    : Eva Nolsäter

Other Lotta movements 
: Lotta Svärd (1918–1944)
: Naiskodukaitse "NKK" (1925–onward)
: Norges Lotteforbund "NFL" (1928–onward)
: Lottekorps (1946–1989)

Footnotes

References

Notes

Print

Web

External links 

Military of Sweden
All-female military units and formations
Military units and formations established in 1924
Volunteer organizations in Sweden